Princess Elene or Elene-Gulchara (born 1591) was a Georgian royal princess (batonishvili) of the Bagrationi dynasty of Kartli branch.

She was a daughter of King George X of Kartli and Tamar-Mariam Lipartiani-Dadiani.

Princess Elene was affianced to Tsar Feodor II of Russia.

In "Istoria Gosudarstva Rossiyskogo" by Nikolay Karamzin she is described by Russian prince Mikhail Tatishev as:

King George X of Kartli gave the oath, but the princess stayed in Georgia until the next Russian visit, by which time Feodor II was no longer alive.

The later fate of the princess is unknown.

References

1591 births
Bagrationi dynasty of the Kingdom of Kartli
Princesses from Georgia (country)
Year of death missing